This is a list of television broadcasters which provide coverage of the Süper Lig, the top level competition for association football in Turkey.

Until 2024

References

External links
 Süper Lig official website

Süper Lig
Association football on television
Turkish Süper Lig